SPARC-related modular calcium-binding protein 2 is a protein that in humans is encoded by the SMOC2 gene.

Clinical relevance
This gene has been shown mutated in clinical cases of major dental developmental defects.

Brachycephalic dogs show a shortening of the snout along with a widening of the hard palate. This skull form is highly associated with disorders of breathing and of the eyes. Brachycephaly in dogs is correlated to a retrotransposon induced missplicing the SMOC2 gene.

References

Further reading